David Christian Griffin, Jr. (born September 26, 1991) is an American football offensive lineman for the Richmond Roughriders of the American Arena League (AAL). He played college football at University of Hawaii at Manoa and attended Florida A&M University Developmental Research School in Tallahassee, Florida. He has also been a member of the Edmonton Eskimos, Iowa Barnstormers, Cedar Rapids Titans,  Cleveland Gladiators and Columbus Lions.

Early life
Griffin attended North Florida Christian High School through this junior year before transferring to Florida A&M University Developmental Research School in Tallahassee, Florida where he played football and basketball.

College career
Griffin attended Coffeyville Community College in 2010, where he redshirted. In 2011, Griffin transferred to Mesa Community College where he played for the Thunderbirds from 2011 to 2012. Griffin then transferred to the Hawaii Rainbow Warriors from 2013 to 2014. He helped the Rainbow Warriors to 1 win. He played in 5 games during his career including 2 starts at tackle. A tear of his Ulnar collateral ligament of elbow joint ended his career at Hawaii early.

Professional career

Edmonton Eskimos
Griffin signed with the Edmonton Eskimos on May 31, 2015. Griffin was released on June 14, 2015.

Iowa Barnstormers
Griffin signed with the Iowa Barnstormers of the Indoor Football League in 2016. Griffin started 9 of 16 games for the Barnstormers. Griffin re-signed with the Barnstormers for 2017. He was released on February 16, 2017.

Cedar Rapids Titans
On February 21, 2017, Griffin signed with the Cedar Rapids Titans. On March 24, 2017, Griffin was placed on the transfer list.

Cleveland Gladiators
On March 23, 2017, Griffin was assigned to the Cleveland Gladiators. On April 26, 2017, Griffin was placed on reassignment. On May 1, 2017, Griffin was placed on league suspension.

Columbus Lions
On May 4, 2017, Griffin signed with the Columbus Lions. On August 4, 2017, Griffin re-signed with the Lions.

References

External links

Mesa Thunderbirds profile
Hawaii Rainbow Warriors profile

Living people
1991 births
American football offensive linemen
Canadian football offensive linemen
American players of Canadian football
Coffeyville Red Ravens football players
Mesa Thunderbirds football players
Hawaii Rainbow Warriors football players
Edmonton Elks players
Iowa Barnstormers players
Cedar Rapids River Kings players
Cleveland Gladiators players
Columbus Lions players
Players of American football from Tallahassee, Florida
American Arena League players